Dukak or Duqaq may refer to:

 Tuqaq (died c. 924 AD), the father of Seljuq, eponymous founder of the Seljuk dynasty
 Duqaq (Seljuk ruler of Damascus) (died 1104), the Seljuq ruler of Damascus from 1095 to 1104